The following is a timeline of the COVID-19 pandemic in Guangdong for the year 2021.

January
On January 1, Guangdong Province reported 3 newly imported confirmed cases, Guangzhou reported 2 cases, from Nigeria and Peru respectively; Shenzhen reported 1 case, from the United States

On January 2, Guangdong Province reported 2 newly imported confirmed cases, Guangzhou reported 1 case from Bangladesh, and Zhaoqing reported 1 case from Indonesia. On the same day, the Guangdong Provincial Center for Disease Control and Prevention announced that a B.1.1.7 mutant strain was found in a throat swab sample of an imported case from the UK recently, which is highly similar to the recent mutated virus gene sequence in the UK.

On January 3, Guangdong Province added 2 newly imported confirmed cases, reported from Guangzhou, from Tanzania and Zambia respectively.

On January 4, Guangdong Province reported 4 newly imported confirmed cases, Guangzhou reported 3 cases from Canada, Zimbabwe and the Democratic Republic of the Congo; Foshan reported 1 case from Egypt.

On January 5th, Guangdong Province reported 3 newly imported confirmed cases, 2 cases were reported in Guangzhou, from the Democratic Republic of the Congo; 1 case was reported in Shenzhen, from Hong Kong.

On January 6, the Guangdong Provincial Center for Disease Control and Prevention stated that it had isolated the variant virus found in South Africa from a throat swab of a confirmed South African who entered Singapore.On the same day, 2 newly imported confirmed cases in Guangdong Province, reported from Guangzhou, came from Iraq.

On January 7, 3 newly imported confirmed cases in Guangdong Province were reported from Guangzhou, from Kenya, the Democratic Republic of the Congo and the Netherlands.

On January 8, Guangdong Province reported 2 newly imported confirmed cases, Guangzhou reported 1 case from Japan, and Zhaoqing reported 1 case from Myanmar.

On January 9, 1 newly imported confirmed case in Guangdong Province, reported from Guangzhou, came from Tanzania.

On January 10, 7 newly imported confirmed cases in Guangdong Province were reported from Guangzhou, including 2 cases from the United States and Nigeria, and the remaining 3 cases from Malaysia, the United Arab Emirates and Jordan.

On January 11, 1 newly imported confirmed case in Guangdong Province, reported from Qingyuan, came from the United States.

On January 12, Guangdong Province reported 2 newly imported confirmed cases, Guangzhou reported 1 case from Egypt, and Shenzhen reported 1 case from Hong Kong.

On January 13, Guangdong Province reported 3 newly imported confirmed cases, Guangzhou reported 2 cases from Malaysia and Iran, and Zhaoqing reported 1 case from Malaysia.

On January 14, 3 newly imported confirmed cases in Guangdong Province were reported from Guangzhou, and they were from the United States, Ghana and Maldives.

On January 16, Guangdong Province reported 2 newly imported confirmed cases, reported from Foshan, from Nigeria and Kuwait respectively.

On January 17, 1 newly imported confirmed case in Guangdong Province, reported from Guangzhou, came from Mozambique.

On January 18, Guangdong Province reported 3 newly imported confirmed cases, Guangzhou reported 2 cases from Zambia and Ghana, and Foshan reported 1 case from the United Arab Emirates.

On January 19, 3 newly imported confirmed cases in Guangdong Province were reported from Guangzhou, all from Zambia.

On January 20, 1 newly imported confirmed case in Guangdong Province was reported from Guangzhou and came from Ghana.

On January 21, there were 4 newly imported confirmed cases in Guangdong Province, all of which were reported from Guangzhou, 2 cases were from Mexico, and the remaining 2 cases were from Zambia and Nigeria.

On January 22, there was one newly imported confirmed case in Guangdong Province, reported from Jiangmen, from Bangladesh. 3 new cases were discharged.

On January 23, a new case of local asymptomatic infection in Guangdong Province was reported by Shenzhen, which was discovered through routine nucleic acid testing of the staff of the quarantined hotel; 5 new imported confirmed cases were added, and Shenzhen reported 2 cases, both from Mozambique; Foshan reported 1 case from Kuwait; Zhaoqing reported 1 case from Nigeria; Jiangmen reported 1 case from Mozambique.

On January 24, 2 newly imported confirmed cases in Guangdong Province were reported from Guangzhou, from the United States and Mexico.

On January 25, Guangdong Province reported 2 newly imported confirmed cases, Guangzhou reported 1 case from Zambia, and Foshan reported 1 case from the United States.

On January 26, Guangdong Province reported 7 newly imported confirmed cases, Guangzhou reported 4 cases, 2 cases were from Zambia, and 2 cases were from the United Arab Emirates; Foshan reported 3 cases, 2 cases were from the United States, and 1 case was from Bangladesh.

On January 27, 1 newly imported confirmed case in Guangdong Province, reported from Guangzhou, came from Nigeria.

On January 28, there were 5 newly imported confirmed cases in Guangdong Province, all of which were reported from Guangzhou and came from the United States, Myanmar, Nepal, Mozambique and Senegal.

On January 30, Guangdong Province reported 3 newly imported confirmed cases, Guangzhou reported 1 case from Malaysia, Shenzhen reported 1 case from Mozambique, and Jiangmen reported 1 case from Tanzania.

On January 31, 1 newly imported confirmed case in Guangdong Province, reported from Guangzhou, came from Malaysia.

February
On February 1, Guangdong Province reported 2 newly imported confirmed cases, Guangzhou reported 1 case from Ghana, and Zhaoqing reported 1 case from Malaysia.

On February 2, 2 newly imported confirmed cases in Guangdong Province were reported from Foshan, from the United States and Kuwait respectively.

On February 3, 3 newly imported confirmed cases in Guangdong Province were reported from Guangzhou, 2 cases were from Malaysia and 1 case was from the United States.

On February 4, 2 newly imported confirmed cases in Guangdong Province were reported from Guangzhou, and they were from Malaysia and Nepal respectively.

On February 5, 1 newly imported confirmed case in Guangdong Province, reported from Foshan, came from Bangladesh.

On February 6, Guangdong Province reported 2 newly imported confirmed cases, Guangzhou reported 1 case from Japan, and Foshan reported 1 case from Iraq.

On February 7, 7 newly imported confirmed cases were confirmed in Guangdong Province. Guangzhou reported that 5 cases came from Indonesia, and the remaining 2 cases came from India and the Netherlands.

March
On March 1, Guangdong Province reported 3 newly imported confirmed cases, Guangzhou reported 2 cases, each from the United States and Turkey; Shenzhen reported 1 case, from South Africa.

April
On April 2, Guangdong Province reported 3 newly imported confirmed cases, Guangzhou reported 2 cases, each from Ukraine and Bangladesh; Shenzhen reported 1 case, from Japan.

May
On May 1, there were 6 newly imported confirmed cases in Guangdong Province, 5 cases were reported in Guangzhou, 3 cases were from Canada, and the remaining 2 cases were from Cambodia and Saudi Arabia.

On May 7, 5 newly imported confirmed cases were confirmed in Guangdong Province. Guangzhou reported that 3 cases came from Saudi Arabia, and the remaining 2 cases came from Bangladesh and Tanzania.On the same day, the Chinese Center for Disease Control and Prevention issued a weekly report in English, stating that two new variants of the Brazilian virus appeared in Guangdong Province on April 30.

June
On June 1, 10 new local confirmed cases were added in Guangdong Province, 7 cases were reported in Guangzhou; 3 cases were reported in Foshan, which were asymptomatic infections transferred to confirmed cases. There were 7 new local asymptomatic infections, 5 cases were reported in Guangzhou, and 2 cases were reported in Shenzhen. There were 3 newly confirmed cases imported from abroad, 2 cases were reported in Guangzhou, from Cambodia and Liberia respectively; 1 case was reported from Foshan, from the Philippines.

July
On July 1, Guangdong Province reported 8 newly imported confirmed cases, Guangzhou reported 7 cases, 2 cases were from Cambodia, and the remaining 5 cases were from the Philippines, Myanmar, Oman, Yemen and Ghana; Zhaoqing reported 1 case from the United Arab Emirates.

August
On August 1, 2 newly imported confirmed cases in Guangdong Province were reported from Guangzhou, from Egypt and Congo (Brazzaville) respectively.

September
On September 1, Guangdong Province reported 9 newly imported confirmed cases, Guangzhou reported 8 cases, 6 cases were from Myanmar, and the remaining 2 cases were from Japan and Cameroon; Shenzhen reported 1 case, from Indonesia.

October
On October 1, Guangdong Province reported 3 newly imported confirmed cases, Guangzhou reported 1 case, from Bangladesh; Foshan reported 2 cases, respectively from the United States and Suriname.

November
On November 1, 2 newly imported confirmed cases in Guangdong Province were reported from Guangzhou, and they were from Japan and Vietnam respectively.

December
On December 1, 1 newly imported confirmed case in Guangdong Province, reported from Shenzhen, from Singapore.

References

2021 in Guangdong

zh:2019冠状病毒病广东省疫情时间线 (2021年)